The Owyhee River is a tributary of the Snake River located in northern Nevada, southwestern Idaho and southeastern Oregon in the United States.

The Owyhee drains a remote area of the arid plateau region immediately north of the Great Basin, rising in northeastern Nevada and flowing generally northward near the Oregon-Idaho border to the Snake River. Its watershed is very sparsely populated.

History of the name
The watershed of the river was part of region inhabited by the Shoshone and Bannock Native Americans. The name of the river is from the older spelling of "Hawaii". It was named for three Native Hawaiian trappers, in the employ of the North West Company, who were sent to explore the uncharted river. They failed to return to the rendezvous near the Boise River and were never seen again. Due to this the river and its region were named "Owyhee".

About one-third of the men with Donald MacKenzie's Snake Country Expeditions of 1819–1820 were Hawaiians, commonly called "Kanakas" or "Sandwich Islanders" in those days, with "Owyhee" being a standard period spelling of the proper Hawaiian language name for the islands, hawai'i, which then was otherwise unused in English. The three Kanakas were detached to trap on the river in 1819 and were probably killed by Native Americans that year. It was not until the spring or early summer of 1820 that MacKenzie learned the news of their deaths (probably at the hands of men belonging to a band of Bannocks led by a chief named The Horse). Native Americans led other trappers to the site, but only one skeleton was located. The earliest surviving record of the name is found on a map dating to 1825, drawn by William Kittson (who was previously with MacKenzie in 1819–1820, and then with Peter Skene Ogden in 1825), on which he notes "Owhyhee River" (his spelling). Journal entries in 1826 by Peter Skene Ogden, a fur trapper who led subsequent Snake Country Expeditions for the Hudson's Bay Company refer to the river primarily as the "Sandwich Island River", but also as "S. I. River", "River Owyhee", and "Owyhee River".

History

Mining

The discovery of gold and silver in the region in 1863 resulted in a temporary influx of miners and the establishment of mining camps, most of which have long since disappeared. The initial discovery was along Jordan Creek, and mining activity rapidly spread through the Owyhee watershed. This activity involved not only placer operations, but also underground mines and mills, resulting in a prolonged history of mining in the region.

Death of Sacagawea's son
In 1866 the son of Sacagawea, Jean Baptiste Charbonneau, died near Jordan Valley after catching a chill upon crossing the Owyhee en route from California to new gold strikes in Montana (one of the gold strikes, near Bannack, Montana, was just a few miles from where he had traveled as a toddler with his mother in the company of William Clark).

Course
It flows north along the east side of the Independence Mountains of Nevada, passing through Wild Horse Reservoir and then cutting northeast past the north end of the range. The river runs through the Humboldt-Toiyabe National Forest, and then past the communities of Mountain City and Owyhee in the Duck Valley Indian Reservation. The main tributary of the South Fork is the Little Owyhee River.

The Owyhee River then enters extreme southeast Oregon in southern Malheur County, generally flowing north in a zigzag course west of the Idaho border. It merges with the West Little Owyhee River from the south, then receives the Middle Fork Owyhee River and North Fork Owyhee River from the east at a location known as "Three Forks." It then passes through the Owyhee Canyon between Big Grassy Mountain and Whitehouse Butte, then turns north, flowing east of Burns Junction and then west of Mahogany Mountain. In this area the Owyhee River receives the tributaries of Jordan Creek, Rattlesnake Creek, and Crooked Creek.

The final stretch of the river, below Owyhee Dam, emerges from the Owyhee Plateau and enters the Snake River Plain.

River modifications

The dam was constructed by the U.S. Bureau of Reclamation primarily to provide irrigation for the agricultural region in southeast Oregon and southwest Idaho, onions and hops are the staple crops in this region. Lake Owyhee State Park and scenic Leslie Gulch are along the eastern shore of the reservoir. Owyhee Dam was built in 1933 and eliminated anadromous fish such as salmon from the Owyhee River basin.

Protected areas

In 1984, the United States Congress designated  of the river as Owyhee Wild and Scenic River under the Wild and Scenic Rivers Act of 1968 to preserve the river in its free-flowing condition. Part of the designation includes the section of the river downstream from the Owyhee Dam, where the river flows through a remote section of deeply incised canyons surrounded by high canyon rims that are habitat for mountain lion, bobcat, mule deer, California bighorn sheep, and a large variety of raptors.

The Omnibus Public Land Management Act of 2009 designated  on and around the Owyhee River in Idaho as wilderness.  The bill was signed into law by President Barack Obama on March 30, 2009.  The new wilderness areas are:

 North Fork Owyhee Wilderness - 
 Owyhee River Wilderness  - 
 Pole Creek Wilderness - 

After negotiations involving Oregon senators Ron Wyden and Jeff Merkley, the Owyhee Act introduced in November 2019. It would preserve  of Owyhee canyonlands as wilderness, while calling for improvements to loop roads to bring in visitors. It also designated  of the river for protection under the Wild and Scenic Rivers Act. It was supported by both ranchers and conservationists, as well as the Northwest Sport Fishing Association.

Tributaries

 Jordan Creek is a  tributary.  It flows generally west from near Silver City, Idaho, in the Owyhee Mountains to near Rome in the Oregon High Desert.
 The West Little Owyhee River has a source at an elevation of  near the Nevada-Oregon border by the community of McDermitt, Nevada. Approximately  in length, the river flows east by Deer Flat and into Louse Canyon. Near a prominent feature known as Twin Buttes, it turns sharply north as it cuts through the Owyhee Desert, making its way to the Owyhee River.
 The Lake Fork West Owyhee River is a short tributary of the West Little Owyhee River that begins near Cat, Bend, and Pedroli springs near the eastern boundary of the Fort McDermitt Indian Reservation in southern Malheur County. It flows generally northeast to meet the larger river in Louse Canyon. The Lake Fork has no named tributaries.

See also
 Green Dragon Canyon
 List of Idaho rivers
 List of longest streams of Idaho
 List of longest streams of Oregon
 List of National Wild and Scenic Rivers
 List of Nevada rivers
 List of rivers of Oregon
 Owyhee

References

External links

 
 Owyhee Watershed Council
 Owyhee River Journey  Video produced by Oregon Field Guide
 National Wild and Scenic Rivers System

 
Rivers of Idaho
Rivers of Nevada
Rivers of Oregon
Owyhee Desert
Tributaries of the Snake River
Wild and Scenic Rivers of the United States
Rivers of Elko County, Nevada
Rivers of Malheur County, Oregon
Rivers of Owyhee County, Idaho